Theeyavan is a 2008 Tamil language romantic thriller film produced, written and directed by B. Kathir. The film stars newcomer Sriranjan, newcomer Udhay and Midhuna, with newcomer Saritha, Radha Ravi, Kuyili, M. S. Bhaskar, Aarthi, Vennira Aadai Moorthy, Pandu, Nizhalgal Ravi and Ganeshkar playing supporting roles. It was released on 31 October 2008.

Plot

The film begins with the college student Dileep (Sriranjan) drugging Anitha during her birthday party, he then sneaks into her home and rapes her in her sleep. Dileep acts as a good person to his family and friends, but he has a lot of bad habits and he is a very possessive person. Dileep's family is known for talking to the spirit from generation to generation.

In his college, Ganesh (Udhay) and Vanitha (Midhuna) fall in love with each other. Tired of drugging and raping aunties, Dileep wants to get married and he then falls under the spell of his classmate Vanitha. While playing a Truth or dare? game with her friends, Vanitha is forced to say "I love you" to Dileep and Dileep, in turn, kisses her in front of a rattled Ganesh. Dileep eventually shows his true colours to his friends and swears them that he will marry Vanitha at any cost. In the meantime, an astrologer says to his parents that if Dileep gets married then he will die. Thereafter, Vanitha starts to behave weirdly when she sees Dileep and she begins to hang out with him. Ganesh and his friends are worried about Vanitha's sudden change, they file a police complaint against Dileep. Ganesh then finds out that when Dileep utters her name, Vanitha becomes possessed. At the police station, Dileep refuses to tell the truth. Through recovered-memory therapy, the chief psychiatrist of the hospital uncovers Dileep's past.

Many years ago, Dileep went to Ooty for his vacation but since the hotels were fully booked for the busy season, he decided to stay in an abandoned mansion. There, he talked to the spirit of Seetha (Saritha), he learned that her brother Bhaskar sold her to the filmmaker Ravi. Ravi attempted to rape her and killed her. Her ghost then murdered her brother and emasculated Ravi. Afterwards, Dileep went every year to the mansion to talk to Seetha's spirit and they became good friends. When Dileep fell in love with Vanitha, he knew that it was impossible to change her mind so Dileep lied to Seetha that he loved her. Dileep wanted to sleep with Vanitha so he forced Seetha to enter her body. When Seetha knew about his perverse intention of raping Vanitha, she saved Vanitha on multiple occasions and threatened Dileep to kill him.

Back to the present, Seetha enters Dileep's body and makes him commit suicide.

Cast

Sriranjan as Dileep
Udhay as Ganesh
Midhuna as Vanitha
Saritha as Seetha
Radha Ravi as Nair, Dileep's father
Kuyili as Dileep's mother
M. S. Bhaskar as Velu
Aarthi
Vennira Aadai Moorthy as College professor
Pandu as Film producer
Nizhalgal Ravi as Ravi
Ganeshkar as Arivu
Mayilsamy as Mayilsamy
Vaiyapuri as Dhandapani
Ajay Rathnam as Police Inspector
Vasu Vikram as Bhaskar
Ponnambalam as Manikkam
Vahini as Anitha
Jai Sakthi
Rithika
Saathappan Nandakumar as Ganesh's father
Halwa Vasu
Kovai Senthil as Arivu's father
Achamillai Gopi as Police Inspector
Poovilangu Mohan
Crane Manohar as Cotton candy seller
LIC Narasimhan as Doctor
 Bava Lakshmanan
Usha Elizabeth as Vanitha's mother
Risha in a special appearance

Production

B. Kathir, who had directed several ad films, made his directorial debut with the romantic thriller Theeyavan under the banner of Eswaar Creations. Newcomers Sriranjan, son of the producer, and Udhay signed to play the lead roles while Midhuna, who made her acting debut in Maa Madurai (2007), was chosen to play the heroine. L. V. Ganesan, the son of veteran musician L. Vaidyanathan, scored for the film. Actor Silambarasan who was L. V. Ganesan's childhood friend was rumoured to render his voice for a song. The film was shot in Hyderabad, Ooty, Mumbai and Chennai. During the shooting of a song in Chennai, actress Midhuna got injured in the leg.

Soundtrack

The film score and the soundtrack were composed by L. V. Ganesan. The soundtrack, released in 2008, features 5 tracks.

References

2008 films
2000s Tamil-language films
Indian romantic thriller films
Indian supernatural horror films
Indian ghost films
Indian romantic horror films
2000s romantic thriller films
2000s supernatural horror films
2000s ghost films
Films shot in Hyderabad, India
Films shot in Ooty
Films shot in Mumbai
Films shot in Chennai
2008 directorial debut films